Brandin is both a given name and a surname. Notable people with the name include:

Brandin Bryant (born 1993), American football player
Brandin Cooks (born 1993), American football player
Brandin Cote (born 1981), Canadian ice hockey player
Brandin Echols (born 1997), American football player
Brandin Knight (born 1981), American basketball player
Claes-Göran Brandin (born 1948), Swedish politician
Maria Brandin (born 1963), Swedish rower

See also
Brandan, given name and surname
Branden (given name)
Branden (surname)
Brandon (given name)
Brandon (surname)